Reader Rabbit is an educational game franchise created in 1984 by The Learning Company. The series is aimed at children from infancy to the age of nine. In 1998, a spiritual successor series called The ClueFinders was released for older students aged seven to twelve.

The games teach language arts including basic skills in reading and spelling and mathematics. The main character in all the titles is named "Reader Rabbit".

History 

The first Reader Rabbit computer game was conceived by the Grimm sisters and titled Reader Rabbit and the Fabulous Word Factory. It was released initially in 1984 and featured in the 1983 holiday special The Computer Chronicles. In 1986, both Reader Rabbit 2.0 and Math Rabbit were released. In 1987, Writer Rabbit was released with the intention of having a Rabbit series that featured different academic subjects. Ultimately, the developers decided to have a Reader Rabbit series that explored subjects beyond reading. With this directional change, Math Rabbit would later be renamed Reader Rabbit with the game title Reader Rabbit's Math. Many critics and gaming historians erroneously assert that the Reader Rabbit series officially began in 1986. The 1990s saw an audio cassette release of some of the game's most popular music, titled Reader Rabbit's Sing Along Favorites, and by 1996 the Reader Rabbit series included a wide variety of titles, including Reader Rabbit's Reading Development Library which allowed players to experience fairy tales via animated storybooks.

In 1995, The Learning Company was bought by SoftKey after a hostile takeover bid. Softkey adopted the name The Learning Company. Softkey embarked on a cost-cutting exercise with the aim to sell cheaper software. The Platinum line of budget titles pushed the retail price for edutainment down to $12.99 in the US, and swapped the fancy packaging for a simple jewel case. At the time, SoftKey founder Kevin O'Leary recalled, "I'd get a $12 million order for "Reader Rabbit"...it would blow up behind me, the logistics. I couldn't deliver", noting that he gave Mike Perik half his equity to solve the problem. In 1998, The Learning Company was acquired by Mattel in a $3.6 billion deal. The toy-maker was looking to enter the interactive market. Mattel planned to expand the Reader Rabbit franchise into a series of interactive electronic plush toys that could download new content from the Internet. Mattel was forced to quickly sell off their properties the following year to avoid bankruptcy, and the Reader Rabbit brand was sold to Riverdeep. From 1998 to 2002, a series called The ClueFinders featuring a Scooby-Doo-like gang of mystery solvers was released with similar subject matter aimed at a more advanced student base, from the third to the sixth grade. The Reader Rabbit Workbook Series was released in 2003, and consisted of three 320-page comprehensive workbooks and five 32-page single-subject workbooks, aimed at children ages three to seven.

The early 2000s, saw the last major PC releases of the franchise. New games have since been released on platforms such as Nintendo Wii, while some parts of older games have been uploaded to the Internet Archive. By 2003, the Reader Rabbit series had been sold in over 40 countries and translated into 13 different languages:

 Chinese (titled 瑞德小兔 / Reid Bunny)
 Danish (titled Fætter Kanin)
 Dutch (titled Robbie Konijn)
 Finnish (titled Jussi Jänö)
 French (titled Lapin Malin) first translation 1998
 German (titled Billi Banni)
 Japanese (titled リーダーラビット / Reader Rabbit)
 Norwegian (titled Labbe Langøre)
 Polish (titled Królik Bystrzak)
 Portuguese (titled Coelho Sabido; ClueFinders titled Os Caça-Pistas)
 Russian (titled Школа Кролика / School Rabbit)
 Spanish (titled El Conejo Lector, first translation 1998)
 Swedish (titled Kalle Kunskap)

There is a Reader Rabbit themed attraction at Parken Zoo in Eskilstuna, Sweden, which replaced the longstanding and successful Phantom Land. Various audio-books have been released by Prelusion Games and Nordic Softsales, including titles such as Kalle Kunskap i Vilda Västern (Reader Rabbit in the Wild West) in 2010. The Brazilian Reader Rabbit, Coelho Sabido, is a trademark of Divertire Editora, a company active in the educational games market since 1998.

In March 2004, LeapFrog and Riverdeep entered into a publishing and distribution agreement for Reader Rabbit. They planned a series of five e-books about phonics that would be released for the LeapPad learning system, but only three e-books were released by fall of that year. Some Reader Rabbit games were re-released for Nintendo Wii console in 2011. Houghton Mifflin Harcourt, the successor to Riverdeep after acquisitions and mergers, currently owns the license for the series and continues to sell the products through various distribution networks.

Design

Plot and gameplay 
The series centers on the adventures of Reader Rabbit and his friends, including Sam the Lion and Matilda the Mouse. The grayish-blue Reader Rabbit is the protagonist of all the games. His wardrobe has included a red T-shirt and a red and blue striped sweater (similar to the Montreal Canadiens jersey, but without the logo).

Generally, the series consists of point-and-click adventure games where the player must use their inventory and interact with characters to solve a series of puzzles. These puzzles were originally reading-based challenges but different titles focus on other subject areas. Visually, the game consists of a series of static screens which the player can navigate through by clicking on certain "travel" hot spots. Other hot spots can trigger an interaction with a character, item, song, or mini-game.

Art 
In the early 1990s, artist Shaowei Liu hand painted backgrounds and animations which were then digitized for the games. In the mid-1990s, artist Frank Cirocco drew the characters and foregrounds in pencil, hiring Mick Gray to ink the line art. By 1997, the characters were redesigned for Reader Rabbit Toddler by Tracy Reynolds of Class 6 Entertainment. For some of the games at this time, the art was provided by Chester Aldridge's company US Equity Holdings. For the later games, Fred Dianda was made Lead Artist. Some line art was worked on by Gerald Broas, who used a 2B pencil to hand draw the backgrounds and characters on 12 field animation paper. For the story books included in the interactive journey and library games, artist Marc Diamond used a LeapPad tablet to sketch the pictures before coloring and shading. The most recent art for the iOS games was done by concept artist Federico Miniaci.

Music 
Each game contains songs that guide the narrative and provide the internal monologs of characters. Composer Scott Lloyd Shelly was particularly proud of composing the music for Reader Rabbit: 1st Grade in 1998. Foreign language versions were created for many of the games to give the franchise global appeal. This extended to the games' songs; one song from Reader Rabbit Preschool was translated into French, German, Portuguese, Russian, and Swedish. A VHS video called Reader Rabbit Sing-A-Song Adventures was released in 2000, featuring a compilation of the series' best songs.

Educational goals 
Education has always been a key part of the games' design, seeking to find a balance between learning and fun. The titles in the series are researched by educators, parents, children and reading specialists to ensure the software is educational, engaging and easy-to-use. The software aimed to promote the use of computers as teaching tools in the classroom. The games covered a range of subjects such as reading, phonics, math, and memory. The A.D.A.P.T. Learning Technology was introduced into Reader Rabbit titles in 1999. The system contained a series of customization features that would facilitate the player's learning by assessing abilities, developing skills, adjusting levels, providing help, and tracking progress.

Products in the franchise

Video games

Compilations

Cassettes and DVD 
 Reader Rabbit's Sing Along Favorites (music cassette)
 Reader Rabbit: Sing-A-Song Adventures (VHS – 2000)
 Reader Rabbit: Wordville Soup (DVD – 2004)
 Reader Rabbit: The Great Alphabet Race (DVD – 2005)

Reader Rabbit Giant Workbooks 
These workbooks were published by The Learning Company and each were supplementary material to a corresponding game. They were republished as Reader Rabbit: Let's Learn by Houghton Mifflin Harcourt:
 Reader Rabbit Kindergarten
 Reader Rabbit Kindergarten: Rhyming Words
 Reader Rabbit Preschool
 Reader Rabbit Preschool: Reading Readiness
 Reader Rabbit Preschool: Colors & Shapes
 Reader Rabbit Preschool: Sounds
 Reader Rabbit Preschool: Alphabet
 Reader Rabbit Starting School Level 1: ABC
 Reader Rabbit 1st Grade
 Reader Rabbit 1st Grade: Spelling
 Reader Rabbit 1st Grade: Phonics
 Reader Rabbit 1st Grade: Writing Mechanics
 Reader Rabbit K-1st Grade: Math
 Reader Rabbit K-1st Grade: Math – Money, Time & Measurement

Reader Rabbit Leapfrog e-books 
These e-books are about phonics and were released under the LeapPad learning system:
 High Flying Circus
 Sam's Sweet Surprise
 The Great Word Chase

Reception

Critical reception 
In 1991, The Chicago Sun-Times noted that Reader Rabbit was "one of the most effective edutainment gaming franchises" and that it had helped many children learn how to read. Computer Shopper appreciated that the games filled a gap in the market; it found that while most reading comprehension titles were aimed at older children, Reader Rabbit uniquely offered games to the preschool age.

In 1995, The New York Times noted that the flagship title of The Learning Company was "unusual in crossing over from home use to in-school, curriculum-based learning". The newspaper noted in 2002 that the series had become an "educational staple in schools and homes" with a long tradition of "quality educational software". The Boston Herald argued that the games' replayability and enjoyment made their costs immediately justifiable. Krystina Madej of Physical Play and Children's Digital Games highlighted the series as an innovator in the budding edutainment genre during the 1980s, following in MECC's The Oregon Trail footsteps to create play-based educational games aimed at young children.

In 2012, PC Mag listed the debut title as one of the 10 Educational PC Games of the 1980s and noted that new titles were still being released.

Sales 
The premiere game in the series, Reader Rabbit and the Fabulous Word Factory, first entered the Billboard Charts for Education Computer Software at number six in May 1985 and re-entered at number 10 two weeks later. The game continued to feature on the charts in following weeks, selling 250,000 units by 1989.

The series was commercially successful throughout its run. By 1991, the series had sold 500,000 copies. The Learning Company had a gross revenue of $27.5 million at the end of the 1993 financial year and 41% revenue growth from 1992–3, largely due to the Reader Rabbit series.

Between 1993 and 2001, the series sold six million copies. Around 2001, prices of the products were tapering and the sales were declining around Europe. By 2002, the series had sold over 25 million copies.

Awards and nominations 
As of 2017, the series has won over 175 awards.
|-
| 1991
| Reader Rabbit 1
| Technology & Learning Magazines Language Arts Program of the Decade
|
|-
| 1991
| Reader Rabbit 2
| Parents' Choice Foundation Award
| 
|-
| 1992
| Reader Rabbit 2
| Software Publishers Association's Award for Best Elementary Education Product
| 
|-
| 1992
| Reader Rabbit 2
| CODiE Award for Best Elementary Education Program
| 
|-
| 1992
| Reader Rabbit 2
| Technology & Learning Magazines Award of Excellence
| 
|-
| 1994
| Reader Rabbit 1
| The National Association of Parenting Publications Awards Gold Medal
| 
|-
| 1994
| Reader Rabbit 2
| Technology & Learning Magazines Software Award for Excellence—Next in Series
| 
|-
| 1995
| Reader Rabbit's Interactive Reading Journey 1
| Home PC's Award of Excellence
| 
|-
| 1995
| Reader Rabbit's Interactive Reading Journey 1
| Parenting Magazines Software Magic Award
| 
|-
| 1995
| Reader Rabbit's Interactive Reading Journey 1
| The Parent Council's Seal for outstanding product
| 
|-
| 1995
| Reader Rabbit's Interactive Reading Journey 1
| Technology & Learning Magazines Award of Excellence for the School category
| 
|-
| 1995
| Reader Rabbit's Interactive Reading Journey 1
| The Parents' Choice Foundation Approval
| 
|-
| 1995
| Reader Rabbit's Interactive Reading Journey 1
| Mac Home Journals Reader's Choice Award
| 
|-
| 1995
| Reader Rabbit's Interactive Reading Journey 1
| CD-ROM Today Magazine's Best Children's Program-Reading Award
| 
|-
| 1995
| Reader Rabbit's Interactive Reading Journey 1
| Home Computing & Entertainment Magazine's Best Educational Program Award
| 
|-
| 1995
| Reader Rabbit 1
| Newsweek Magazine's Editors' Choice Award
| 
|-
| 1995
| Reader Rabbit 2
| Only the Best: The Annual Guide to the Highest-Rated Educational Software/Multimedia, 1994/95
| 
|-
| 1995
| Reader Rabbit 3
| Only the Best: The Annual Guide to the Highest-Rated Educational Software/Multimedia, 1994/95
| 
|-
| 1996
| Reader Rabbit's Interactive Reading Journey 2
| SuperKids Software Award for Best Reading Software
| 
|-
| 1996
| Reader Rabbit's Interactive Math Journey
| Curriculum Administrator Magazine's Top 100 Districts' Choice Award
| 
|-
| 1996
| Reader Rabbit Reading 1
| Parents' Choice Foundation Best Software of the Year
| 
|-
| 1996
| Reader Rabbit Reading 1
| Language Art's Technology & Learning Magazine Program of the Decade
| 
|-
| 1997
| Reader Rabbit's Interactive Reading Journey 2
| The National Educational Media Network Silver Apple
| 
|-
| 1997
| Reader Rabbit's Interactive Reading Journey 2
| Newsweek Editor's Choice Award
| 
|-
| 1997
| Reader Rabbit's Interactive Reading Journey 2
| Parent's Choice Gold Award
| 
|-
| 1997
| Reader Rabbit's Interactive Math Journey
| Home PCs Editor's Choice Top 100 Software Award
| 
|-
| 1997
| Reader Rabbit's Interactive Math Journey
| Bologna New Media Prize for Best Math Title (cosponsored by Children's Software Revue)
| 
|-
| 1997
| Reader Rabbit's Interactive Math Journey
| Family PCs Recommended Software Seal
| 
|-
| 1998
| Reader Rabbit's 1st Grade
| Parents' Choice Foundation Award
| Gold Award
|-
| 1998
| Reader Rabbit's First Grade
| Interactive Achievement Award for Computer Edutainment Game of the Year
| 
|-
| 1998
| Reader Rabbit's 2nd Grade
| Parents' Choice Foundation Award
| Silver Honor
|-
| 1998
| Reader Rabbit – 2nd Grade
| Newsweek Magazine Editor's Choice Award
| 
|-
| 1998
| Reader Rabbit's Math Ages 6–9
| Parents' Choice Foundation Award
| Gold Award
|-
| 2001
| Reader Rabbit 1st Grade: Capers on Cloud Nine!
| Parents' Choice Foundation Award
| Approved
|-
| 2001
| Reader Rabbit 2nd Grade: Mis-cheese-ious Dreamship Adventures!
| Parents' Choice Foundation Award
| Approved
|-
| 2001
| Reader Rabbit Kindergarten: Bounce Down in Balloon Town!
| Parents' Choice Foundation Award
| Approved
|-
| 2005
| Reader Rabbit series – "Sam's Sweet Surprise", "High Flying Circus", "Great Word Chase" – for LeapPadBrad (Fuller, Don Diekneite – Music, Sound Effects, Voice Overs)
| GANG Award for Best Audio – Other
| 
|-
| 2005
| Reader Rabbit: Wordville Soup (DVD)
| Parents' Choice Foundation Award
| Recommended
|-
| 2011
| Reader Rabbit: The Great Alphabet Race (DVD)
| Parents' Choice Foundation Award
| Recommended
|-
| 2011
| Reader Rabbit Kindergarten
| Academics' Choice
| 
|-
| 2011
| Reader Rabbit – Kindergarten
| Parents' Choice Foundation Award
| Approved
|-
| 2011
| Reader Rabbit – 1st Grade
| Parents' Choice Foundation Award
| Approved
|-
| 2011
| Reader Rabbit – Preschool
| Parents' Choice Foundation Award
| Approved
|-
| 2011
| Reader Rabbit – 2nd Grade
| Parents' Choice Foundation Award
| Approved
|}

References

External links 

 Official website
 

1984 video games
Children's educational video games
Classic Mac OS games
Houghton Mifflin Harcourt franchises
The Learning Company games
Video games about rabbits and hares
Video game franchises introduced in 1984
Video games adapted into films
Windows games